Gerardus "Gerard" Lautenschutz  (born 27 November 1928) is a sailor from the Netherlands, who represented his country at the 1960 Summer Olympics in Naples. Lautenschutz, as crew on the Dutch Flying Dutchman Daisy (H102), took the 5th place with helmsman Ben Verhagen. After 5 races Lautenschutz needed to go home due to family circumstances. The last two races were crewed by Jaap Helder. Lautenschutz was born in Amsterdam.

Sources

External links
  

1928 births
Possibly living people
Sportspeople from Amsterdam
Dutch male sailors (sport)
Sailors at the 1960 Summer Olympics – Flying Dutchman
Olympic sailors of the Netherlands